Angela Singer (born 1966 in Essex) is an artist of British and New Zealand nationality who lives in Wellington, New Zealand. An animal rights activist, she addresses the way in which people exploit animals and the environment through the repurposing and remodelling of vintage taxidermy, a process she calls "de-taxidermy". Since the 1990s her work has been exhibited both in New Zealand and internationally.

Education 
Singer graduated in 2002 from the Elam School of Fine Arts, University of Auckland with an MFA. She lives with her partner, artist Daniel Unverricht, in Wellington, New Zealand.

Art 
Since the mid-1990s, Singer's art has explored the human and non-human animal relationship, driven by her concern with the ethical and epistemological consequences of humans using non-human life, and the role that humans play in the exploitation and destruction of animals and our environment. Singer sees the boundaries separating other species from humans as permeable.

She sculpts in various media including modelling clay, wax, fibre, ceramics, gemstones, and vintage jewelry, as well as wool and silk. Many of her sculptural works combine mixed media with vintage taxidermy. Singer is known for working with vintage hunting trophy taxidermy, which she recycles into new sculptural forms to explore the human/animal divide. She calls this practice “de-taxidermy”, a process which involves revealing the wounds inflicted on the animal, wounds that are obscured by the taxidermy process and its attempted "rescue from time". Singer incorporates into her work some of the history of the death of the animal, which she obtains from those who give her the vintage taxidermy.

Like Karen Knorr, Singer uses old hunting trophies or vintage taxidermy that natural history museums have thrown away. Some of the trophy taxidermy Singer uses is found discarded in dumpsters and garbage piles. Curator Jo-Ann Conklin writes:A number of artists in the exhibition react to human treatment of animals and the environment. New Zealand artist and animal activist Angela Singer rails against trophy hunting. Her latest work, Spurts (2015), depicts a decapitated deer with cartoony yet still gruesome bubble-gum pink “blood” spurting from it neck. Mark Dion’s Concrete Jungle (1993) is…the detritus of our contemporary consumer culture — a pile of discards and garbage in which animals attempt to survive.

Activism 
Singer is an artist and an animal advocate. Like other artists such as Sue Coe, she is concerned with the ethics of using live animals in art. She will not work with living animals or have living creatures harmed or killed for her art. In the early 1990s she worked with the animal rights group Animal Liberation Victoria, Australia (ALV) antivivisection campaign.

A quote from Singer, regarding her use of taxidermy as an art form:I think using taxidermy is a way for me to honour the animals’ life, because all the taxidermy I use was once a trophy kill. ... The very idea of a trophy animal is sickening to me.She is not related to Peter Singer, the animal rights activist and philosopher.

Exhibitions 

 Curious Creatures & Marvellous Monsters. Museum of New Zealand Te Papa Tongarewa, Wellington, New Zealand. 18 Aug – 4 Nov 2018 
 The Sexual Politics of Meat. The Animal Museum, Los Angeles, USA. 25 Feb – 30 April 2017 
 Dead Animals, or the Curious Occurrence of Taxidermy in Contemporary Art. David Winton Bell Gallery, List Art Center, Providence, Rhode Island, USA. 23 Jan – 27 Mar 2016 
 Ecce animalia. Museum of Contemporary Sculpture, Poland. 8 March – 15 June 2014 
 Points de vue d’artistes. Universcience Cité des sciences et de l’industrie, Paris, France. 23 September 2013 – 1 March 2014  
 Unnatural Natural History. Royal West of England Academy (RWA), Bristol, UK. 14 July – 23 Sept 2012 
 Controversy: The power of art. Mornington Peninsula Regional Gallery, Victoria, Australia. 21 June – 12 Aug 2012 
 The Enchanted Forest. Strychnin Gallery, Berlin, Germany, May 13 – 5 June, and Musei Civici, Palazzo S. Francesco, Reggio Emilia, Italy, 17 June – 31 Aug 2011
 Reconstructing the Animal. Plimsoll Gallery, University of Tasmania, Centre for the Arts, Australia. 18 March – 15 April 2011
 The Enchanted Palace. Cabinet of Curiosities. Kensington Palace, London. Mar–Nov, 2010
 Creature Discomforts. The Suter Art Gallery Te Aratoi o Whakatū, Nelson, NZ. 13 May – 21 June 2009
 The Idea of the Animal. Melbourne International Arts Festival. RMIT Gallery, RMIT University, Melbourne, Australia. 12 Aug – 18 Nov 2006
 Animal Nature. Miller Gallery at Carnegie Mellon University, Pittsburgh, USA. 26 Aug – 2 Oct, 2005  
 Animality. Blue Oyster Art Project Space, Dunedin, New Zealand. 24 June – 5 July 2003

See also 
Mark Dion
Maurizio Cattelan
Annette Messager
 Joan Fontcuberta

References

Further reading 

Modern Painters The Right Stuff article
Antennae Journal of Nature in Visual Culture, UK. Issue 7, 2008. Death of the Animal. Angela Singer: Animal Rights and Wrongs. Giovanni Aloi
"Animality: Cultural Constructions of the Animal" Blue Oyster Art Gallery and Project Space
New Zealand Listener Second Nature review
New Zealand Listener review Animality
Art New Zealand review Insides Outsides
The Independent. Fantasy fashion fit for a princess, The Enchanted Palace exhibition, Kensington Palace, London
The Idea of the Animal 2006 Melbourne International Arts Festival
Killing Animals. Eds. The Animal Studies Group (2006) Urbana and Chicago: University of Illinois Press. [ (cloth),  (pbk.)]
Animal Nature. Ed. J. Strayer (2005) Pittsburgh: Regina Gouger Miller Gallery, Carnegie Mellon University.

External links
Angela Singer website
The Criminal Animal 
Animal Nature

Living people
1966 births
21st-century sculptors
20th-century British sculptors
20th-century English women artists
21st-century English women artists
Anti-vivisectionists
English activists
English animal rights activists
English women activists
People from Essex
University of Auckland alumni
New Zealand women artists